Wind Creek State Park is a public recreation area located  south of Alexander City, Alabama, on the western side of Lake Martin, a  reservoir on the Tallapoosa River. The state park occupies  and is managed by the Alabama Department of Conservation and Natural Resources.

Activities and amenities
The park offers boating, fishing, swimming, picnicking, hiking and equestrian trails, a large camping area, and rental cabins. A grain silo built in 1915 that sits on the edge of the lake is topped by a viewing platform and has a nature center in its base.

Its trail system was designated as a National Recreation Trail in 2011. The park has nearly 600 camping sites in one of the largest state-owned campgrounds in the United States. Park events include fishing competitions and skiing/wake-boarding shows. The park also has multiple playgrounds.

References

External links
Wind Creek State Park Alabama Department of Conservation and Natural Resources

State parks of Alabama
Protected areas of Tallapoosa County, Alabama
National Recreation Trails in Alabama